This is a list of transfers involving clubs that played in the 2010 League of Ireland Premier Division and 2010 League of Ireland First Division.

The pre-season transfer window opened on 1 December 2009, and closed on 22 February 2010 for domestic transfers, and on 2 March 2010 for foreign transfers. Players without a club may join one at any time, either during or in between transfer windows.

Pre-Season Transfers

Premier Division

Bohemians

Cork City

Drogheda Utd

Dundalk

Galway Utd

St Pat's Ath

Shamrock Rovers

Sligo Rovers

Sporting Fingal

UCD

First Division

Athlone Town

Bray Wanderers

Derry City

Finn Harps

Limerick

Longford Town

Mervue Utd

Monaghan Utd

Salthill Devon

Shelbourne

Waterford Utd

Wexford Youths

Transfers
Ireland
Lists of Republic of Ireland football transfers